Émile Koehl (8 March 1921 – 6 January 2013) was a French politician and deputy of the French National Assembly 1978–1993, representing centre-right Union for French Democracy for the Bas-Rhin's 1st, Alsace, who also served as 1st deputy mayor in Strasbourg, "playing a key role in Strasbourg during a quarter-century".

Biography
A member of the centre-right political party Union for French Democracy, the predecessor of the Democratic Movement, Koehl initially served as 1st deputy mayor in Strasbourg, Alsace, to Pierre Pflimlin and :fr:Marcel Rudloff, as well as in the general department council of Bas-Rhin. He represented the citizens of Koenigshoffen, Elsau and Montagne Verte.

Koehl was subsequently elected deputy of the National Assembly of France 1978–1993, where he represented Bas-Rhin's 1st, a legislative constituency corresponding to the central cantons of Strasbourg.

Besides politics, Koehl held various civil offices, ranging from real estate to cultural heritage, including relating to Château d'Andlau in Bas-Rhin.

Together with Louis Jung, Adrien Zeller, Marcel Rudloff, and Yvonne Knorr, Émile Koehl formed "a section of history of Christian democracy in Strasbourg and Alsace". "A committed man faithful to his humanist values", "convivial and respectful of all", according to :fr:André Schneider, deputy of the Union for a Popular Movement, he was "appreciated both by his friends as well as his political adversaries", according to Roland Ries, socialist mayor of Strasbourg.

Koehl, who "embodied the spirit of the neighbourhoods of Strasbourg, including the faubourg of Koenigshoffen", throughout his life remained attached to the Parish of Saint Joseph in Strasbourg and its activities.

He died on 6 January 2013 in Strasbourg, Alsace.

Distinctions
 : Chevalier of the Legion of Honour (2003)

References

Bibliography
 « Émile Koehl », by François Joseph Fuchs, in Nouveau dictionnaire de biographie alsacienne, vol. 21, p. 2059

External links
 French National Assembly

1921 births
2013 deaths
Politicians from Strasbourg
Union for French Democracy politicians
Deputies of the 6th National Assembly of the French Fifth Republic
Deputies of the 7th National Assembly of the French Fifth Republic
Deputies of the 8th National Assembly of the French Fifth Republic
Deputies of the 9th National Assembly of the French Fifth Republic
Chevaliers of the Légion d'honneur